James Victor Rowell (September 18, 1939 – November 16, 2021) was an American politician. He served as a member of the South Carolina House of Representatives.

Life and career 
Rowell was born in Kingstree, South Carolina, the son of Hallie Boykin and Ervin Robert Rowell. He attended Williamsburg High School and the University of South Carolina.

In 1969, Rowell was elected to the South Carolina House of Representatives, representing Williamsburg County, South Carolina.

Rowell died in November 2021 at his home, at the age of 82.

References 

1939 births
2021 deaths
People from Kingstree, South Carolina
Members of the South Carolina House of Representatives
20th-century American politicians
University of South Carolina alumni